

The Faucett F-19 was a 1940s Peruvian eight-seat high-wing transport monoplane built by the airline Faucett Perú for its own use.

Development
To meet its own requirement for an eight-seat transport the airline's engineering department designed and built the Faucett F-19. The design was based on the Stinson SM-1 Detroiter with improvements to meet the airline's specific operating requirements.

The F-19 was a high-wing braced monoplane with a fixed tailwheel landing gear or floats. The cabin sat two crew and six passengers. Some aircraft were used for cargo work with no main cabin windows. 36 examples were built between 1934 and 1946.

The aircraft was powered by an 875 hp (652 kW) Pratt & Whitney Wasp radial engine but the seaplane version use a 600 hp (447 kW) Pratt & Whitney Wasp radial engine. Most of the aircraft were built and used by the airline but a number were supplied to the Peruvian Government.

Specifications (Landplane)

References
 The Illustrated Encyclopedia of Aircraft (Part Work 1982-1985), 1985, Orbis Publishing

See also
 FMA AeT.1

1940s Peruvian airliners